Danilo Pires Costa (born 21 March 1992 in São Luís, Maranhão), known as Danilo Pires, is a Brazilian footballer who plays as a midfielder for Central.

Honours
Atlético Mineiro
Campeonato Mineiro: 2015

CRB
Campeonato Alagoano: 2017

External links
  Ogol
 

1992 births
Living people
Sportspeople from Maranhão
Brazilian footballers
Association football midfielders
Campeonato Brasileiro Série A players
Campeonato Brasileiro Série B players
Campeonato Brasileiro Série C players
Central Sport Club players
Santa Cruz Futebol Clube players
Clube Atlético Mineiro players
Esporte Clube Bahia players
Clube de Regatas Brasil players
Paysandu Sport Club players
Sampaio Corrêa Futebol Clube players
Clube Náutico Capibaribe players
Associação Desportiva Confiança players
Uruguayan Primera División players
Club Atlético River Plate (Montevideo) players
Brazilian expatriate footballers
Brazilian expatriate sportspeople in Uruguay
Expatriate footballers in Uruguay